This is a list of notable restaurants in Istanbul. It includes a listing of notable cafés. Istanbul is the most populous city in Turkey.

-(1): Closed in 2022

 
Istanbul
Istanbul-related lists